Robert Morris Sapolsky (born April 6, 1957) is an American neuroendocrinology researcher and author. He is a professor of biology, neurology, neurological sciences, and neurosurgery at Stanford University. In addition, he is a research associate at the National Museums of Kenya.

Early life and education 
Sapolsky was born in Brooklyn, New York, to immigrants from the Soviet Union. His father, Thomas Sapolsky, was an architect who renovated the restaurants Lüchow's and Lundy's. Robert was raised an Orthodox Jew and spent his time reading about and imagining living with silverback gorillas. By age 12, he was writing fan letters to primatologists. He attended John Dewey High School and, by that time, was reading textbooks on the subject and teaching himself Swahili.

Sapolsky describes himself as an atheist. He said in his acceptance speech for the Emperor Has No Clothes Award, "I was raised in an Orthodox household, and I was raised devoutly religious up until around age 13 or so. In my adolescent years, one of the defining actions in my life was breaking away from all religious belief whatsoever."

In 1978, Sapolsky received his B.A. in biological anthropology, summa cum laude, from Harvard University. He then went to Kenya to study the social behaviors of baboons in the wild. When the Uganda–Tanzania War broke out in the neighboring countries, Sapolsky decided to travel into Uganda to witness the war up close, later commenting, "I was twenty-one and wanted adventure. [...] I was behaving like a late-adolescent male primate." He went to Uganda's capital Kampala, and from there to the border with Zaire (now the Democratic Republic of the Congo), and then back to Kampala, witnessing some fighting, including the Ugandan capital's conquest by the Tanzanian army and its Ugandan rebel allies on 10–11 April 1979. Sapolsky then returned to New York and studied at Rockefeller University, where he received his Ph.D. in neuroendocrinology working in the lab of endocrinologist Bruce McEwen.

After the initial year-and-a-half field study in Africa, he returned every summer for another 25 years to observe the same group of baboons, from the late 1970s to the early 1990s. He spent 8 to 10 hours a day for approximately four months each year recording the behaviors of these primates.

Career 
Sapolsky is the John A. and Cynthia Fry Gunn Professor at Stanford University, holding joint appointments in several departments, including Biological Sciences, Neurology & Neurological Sciences, and Neurosurgery.

As a neuroendocrinologist, he has focused his research on issues of stress and neuronal degeneration, as well as on the possibilities of gene therapy strategies for protecting susceptible neurons from disease. He is working on gene transfer techniques to strengthen neurons against the disabling effects of glucocorticoids. Each year, Sapolsky spends time in Kenya studying a population of wild baboons in order to identify the sources of stress in their environment, and the relationship between personality and patterns of stress-related disease in these animals. More specifically, Sapolsky studies the cortisol levels between the alpha male and female and the subordinates to determine stress level. An early but still relevant example of his studies of olive baboons is found in his 1990 Scientific American article "Stress in the Wild". He has also written about neurological impairment and the insanity defense within the American legal system.

Sapolsky's work has been featured widely in the press, most notably in the National Geographic documentary Stress: Portrait of a Killer, articles in The New York Times, Wired magazine, the Stanford magazine, and The Tehran Times. His speaking style (e.g., on Radiolab, The Joe Rogan Experience, and his Stanford human behavioral biology lectures) has garnered attention. Sapolsky's specialization in primatology and neuroscience has made him prominent in the public discussion of mental health—and, more broadly, human relationships—from an evolutionary perspective.

Sapolsky has received numerous honors and awards for his work, including a MacArthur Fellowship in 1987, an Alfred P. Sloan Fellowship, and the Klingenstein Fellowship in Neuroscience. He was also awarded the National Science Foundation Presidential Young Investigator Award, the Young Investigator of the Year Awards from the Society for Neuroscience, the International Society for Psychoneuroendocrinology, and the Biological Psychiatry Society.

In 2007, he received the John P. McGovern Award for Behavioral Science, awarded by the American Association for the Advancement of Science.

In 2008, he received Wonderfest's Carl Sagan Prize for Science Popularization. In February 2010 Sapolsky was named to the Freedom From Religion Foundation's Honorary Board of distinguished achievers, following the Emperor Has No Clothes Award for 2002.

His conferences and talks are published in Stanford's YouTube channel.

Personal life 
Sapolsky is married to Lisa Sapolsky, a doctor in neuropsychology. They have two children. Sapolsky was a passionate amateur soccer player, and used to play three times a week, but stopped due to back problems.

Works

Books 
 Stress, the Aging Brain, and the Mechanisms of Neuron Death (MIT Press, 1992) 
 Why Zebras Don't Get Ulcers (1994, Holt Paperbacks/Owl 3rd Rep. Ed. 2004) 
 The Trouble with Testosterone: And Other Essays on the Biology of the Human Predicament (Scribner, 1997) 
 Junk Food Monkeys (Headline Publishing, 1997)  (UK edition of The Trouble with Testosterone)
 A Primate's Memoir (Touchstone Books, 2002) 
 Monkeyluv: And Other Essays on Our Lives as Animals (Scribner, 2005) 
 Behave: The Biology of Humans at Our Best and Worst (Penguin Press, May 2017)

Video courses 
 Your Evolved Brain Is at the Mercy of Your Reptilian Impulses and Vice Versa
Sapolsky, Robert. Human Behavioral Biology, 25 lectures (Last 2 lectures were not taped / included in the official Stanford playlist but older versions/tapings of those lectures are available here).
 .

See also 
 Hans Selye
 Walter Bradford Cannon
 Paul Radin
Whitehall Study

References

Works cited

External links 

Robert Sapolsky profile at Stanford School of Medicine
 

1957 births
Living people
Jewish American atheists
American neuroscientists
Jewish neuroscientists
Jewish American scientists
American endocrinologists
MacArthur Fellows
Stanford University Department of Biology faculty
Stanford University School of Medicine faculty
John Dewey High School alumni
Harvard University alumni
Sloan Research Fellows
Rockefeller University alumni
Scientists from New York (state)